Jean Bollack (15 March 1923 – 4 December 2012) was a French philosopher, philologist and literary critic.

Biography 

He then established the "Centre de recherche philologique" in Lille, which he ran for some years and to which his friend Heinz Wismann participated. According to Barbara Cassin, his philological work is remarkable for its "extraordinary textual vigilance".

In addition to his work as a Hellenist with his wife and collaborator Mayotte Bollack, he has published studies on the poetry of Paul Celan. He is considered one of the most penetrating commentators on Celan.

Publications 
 Empédocle 1 : « Introduction à l'ancienne physique », Paris, Éditions de Minuit, coll. "Le sens commun", 1965, (rééd. des 3 volumes) coll. Tel Éditions Gallimard.
 Empédocle 2 : « Les Origines », edition and translation of fragments and testimonies, Paris, Minuit, coll. "Le sens commun", 1969. Tel Gallimard.
 Empédocle 3 : « Les Origines: commentaire », commentary, Paris, Minuit, coll. "Le sens commun", 1969. Tel Gallimard.
 Héraclite ou la séparation, in collaboration with Heinz Wismann, Paris, Minuit, coll. "Le sens commun", 1972. [Reference book]
 La Pensée du plaisir. Epicure : textes moraux, commentaire, Paris, Minuit, 1975.
 La Grèce de personne : les mots sous le mythe, Paris, Éditions du Seuil, coll. "L'ordre philosophique", 1997.
 Euripides, Iphigénie à Aulis, transl. in coll. with Mayotte Bollack, Paris, Minuit, 1990.
 Pierre de cœur, (unpublished poem by Paul Celan), Pierre Fanlac Éditeur, 1991.
 Euripides, Andromaque, transl. in coll. with Mayotte Bollack, Paris, Minuit, 1994.
 La naissance d’Œdipe, (translation and comment of Œdipus Rex), Gallimard, 1995.
 Euripides, Hélène, transl. in coll. with Mayotte Bollack, Paris, Minuit, 1997.
 Sophocles, Antigone, trans. in coll. with Mayotte Bollack, Paris, Minuit, 1999.
 Sens contre sens. Comment lit-on? Interview with Patrick Llored. La Passe du vent, 2000.
 Poésie contre poésie (Celan et la littérature), PUF, "Perspectives germaniques", 2001.
 Piedra de corazón. Un poema póstumo de Paul Celan. With the help of Arnau Pons. Madrid, Arena Libros, 2002.
 L'écrit. Une poétique dans l'œuvre de Celan, PUF, "Perspectives germaniques", 2003.
 Euripides, Les Bacchantes, transl. in coll. with Mayotte Bollack, Paris, Minuit, 2004.
 Poesía contra poesía. Celan y la literatura. With the help of Arnau Pons. Madrid. Trotta, 2005.

See also 
 Empedocles
 Heraclitus
 Parmenides
 Paul Celan
 Péter Szondi

Bibliography 
 Christoph König, Denis Thouard (éd.), La philologie au présent : pour Jean Bollack, Villeneuve-d'Ascq, Presses universitaires du Septentrion, 2010 (collection Cahiers de philologie)
 Christoph König, Heinz Wismann (éd.), "La lecture insistante. Autour de Jean Bollack", Paris, Albin Michel, 2011 (Colloque de Cerisy).

References

External links 
 Site officiel
 In memoriam Jean Bollack on the blog Insula
 Interview on France Culture in the program Du jour au lendemain by Alain Veinstein (30 January 1998):  Accessdate 6 December 2012.
 "X", short film by Pierre Deschamps, (22') - La Fémis, les films des étudiants, promotion 2014. (accessdate 15 September 2016).

1923 births
Writers from Strasbourg
2012 deaths
20th-century French philosophers
French philologists
French literary critics
French scholars of ancient Greek philosophy
French hellenists
French expatriates in Switzerland